The 2016–17 Army Black Knights men's basketball team represented the United States Military Academy during the 2016–17 NCAA Division I men's basketball season. The Black Knights, led by first-year head coach Jimmy Allen, played their home games at Christl Arena in West Point, New York as members of the Patriot League. They finished the season 13–19, 6–12 in Patriot League play to finish in eighth place. As the No. 8 seed in the Patriot League tournament, they defeated American in the first round before losing to top-seeded Bucknell in the quarterfinals.

Previous season
The Black Knights finished the 2015–16 season 19–14, 9–9 in Patriot League play to finish in a four-way tie for fourth place. They defeated Colgate in the quarterfinals of the Patriot League tournament to advance to the semifinals where they lost to Holy Cross. They were invited to the CollegeInsider.com Tournament, where they lost in the first round to NJIT.

On March 25, 2016, Zach Spiker resigned as head coach to accept the head coaching position at Drexel. He finished with a seven-year record of 102–112. On April 6, the school hired Jimmy Allen as head coach.

Offseason

Departures

2016 recruiting class

2017 recruiting class

Roster

Schedule and results

|-
!colspan=9 style=| Non-conference regular season

|-
!colspan=9 style=| Patriot League regular season

|-
!colspan=9 style=| Patriot League tournament

References

Army Black Knights men's basketball seasons
Army
Army Black Knights men's basketball
Army Black Knights men's basketball